"The Scotts" (stylized in all caps) is a song by American hip hop super-duo The Scotts, composed of rappers Travis Scott and Kid Cudi. It was released in various formats, including on 7-inch vinyl, cassette and as a CD single through Epic, Cactus Jack and Wicked Awesome on April 24, 2020. The song release was supported by four different visuals on YouTube. 

The song debuted atop the Billboard Hot 100, for the chart dated May 9, 2020, becoming Scott's third US number-one single, following "Sicko Mode" and "Highest in the Room", as well as Cudi's first US number-one single.

Both artists had previously collaborated on Scott's "Through the Late Night" and "Way Back" on Birds in the Trap Sing McKnight (2016), Cudi's "Baptized in Fire" on Passion, Pain & Demon Slayin' (2016), and Scott's "Stop Trying to Be God" on Astroworld (2018). On September 3, 2021, Kid Cudi stated via Twitter that a full length "The Scotts" album was in store for the future, though he noted that he did not know when it would happen, only that it would at some point. In December 2022, Cudi revealed he was no longer working on the album, effectively announcing its cancellation.

Background and promotion
On April 20, 2020, it was reported that Scott teamed up with Fortnite Battle Royale to start a virtual tour through the game called "Astronomical" starting on April 23 until April 25. The rapper would premiere and play a new song at several different times during the game. Players of the game got to hear snippets of the song before its official release. In total, the concert was witnessed by an audience of over 12 million players. On April 23, Scott revealed the cover art of the song on his Instagram and announced that the song would feature Kid Cudi. The song title is a reference to Scott's stage surname and Cudi's real first name, who inspired Scott to take the name in the first place. The cover art of the single was created by American artist Kaws.

Critical reception
To Charles Holmes of Rolling Stone, the song felt "like a symbolic passing of the torch" after Scott's longstanding admiration for Cudi's work but eventually thought that "the results are mixed" despite having been "very hyped" beforehand. Rap-Up described the song as an "explosive banger" with Scott igniting "the two-minute track while Cudder keeps the fire burning".

Chart performance
"The Scotts" debuted at number one the Billboard Hot 100 on the week of May 9, 2020. The song became Scott's 3rd number one single and Cudi's first. The song also made Scott the sixth artist in history to have multiple songs that debuted at number one following Mariah Carey, Britney Spears, Justin Bieber, Drake and Ariana Grande.

Personnel
Credits adapted from Tidal.

 Jacques Webster (Travis Scott) – vocals, songwriting, composition, recording engineering, uncredited co-production
 Scott Mescudi (Kid Cudi) – vocals, songwriting, composition
 David Biral – songwriting, composition, production
 Denzel Baptiste – songwriting, composition, production
 Mike Dean – songwriting, composition, master engineering, mixing engineering, uncredited co-production
 Oladipo Omishore – songwriting, composition, production
 Patrick Reynolds – songwriting, composition, production
 Jimmy Cash – recording engineering
 Ali Adel - music video editing

Charts

Weekly charts

Year-end charts

Certifications

Release history

See also
List of Billboard Hot 100 number ones of 2020

References

2020 singles
2020 songs
Billboard Hot 100 number-one singles
Canadian Hot 100 number-one singles
Number-one singles in Greece
Number-one singles in Portugal
Travis Scott songs
Kid Cudi songs
Songs written by Mike Dean (record producer)
Songs written by Travis Scott
Songs written by Kid Cudi
Epic Records singles
Cactus Jack Records singles
Songs written by Dot da Genius
Songs written by Plain Pat
Song recordings produced by Take a Daytrip